Joël Mall (born 5 April 1991) is a Swiss professional footballer who plays as a goalkeeper for Olympiakos Nicosia. He has appeared for the Swiss under-20 national football team.

Career
Mall attracted media attention in November 2014 when he pulled off a spectacular double save in a game against FC Zürich. Zürich were awarded a penalty which was taken by Amine Chermiti. Mall saved the initial shot but it rebounded back to Chermiti who shot again, but Mall saved the second shot as well. Incredibly Chermiti then had a third shot at goal but this time it was acrobatically hooked off the line by defender Igor N'Ganga. Mall was under contract with FC Aarau and was used there from the 2008/09 season for the reserve team in the 5th division. At the beginning of the 2011/12 season he ousted Sascha Studer as first-team goalkeeper in the Challenge League , through the club's promotion he then played in the Super League from the 2013/14 season. He made his professional debut in the top flight on March 21, 2010 in an away game against Neuchâtel Xamax the game was lost 1:2.

In June 2015, Mall moved from Super League relegated FC Aarau to record champions Grasshopper Club Zurich and signed a two-year contract.

On June 1, 2017, Mall moved from Grasshopper Club Zürich to Bundesliga relegated SV Darmstadt 98 . There he made his first competitive appearance in the 3-4 home defeat against 1. FC Nürnberg on October 16, 2017 (10th matchday) because first-choice goalkeeper Daniel Heuer Fernandes broke his finger in training. After Heuer Fernandes' recovery, he injured his own shoulder which left him only No. 3 by the end of the season.

This eventually saw a move to Cyprus for Paphos FC in 2018 and a year later he moved to Apollon Limassol within the league . He joined AEK Larnaka in early 2021 and Olympiakos Nicosia in mid-year.

Career statistics

References

External links
 FC Aarau Profile 
 football.ch profile 

1991 births
Living people
People from Baden, Switzerland
Association football goalkeepers
Swiss men's footballers
FC Aarau players
Grasshopper Club Zürich players
SV Darmstadt 98 players
Pafos FC players
Apollon Limassol FC players
Swiss Super League players
Swiss Challenge League players
2. Bundesliga players
Cypriot First Division players
Swiss expatriate footballers
Swiss expatriate sportspeople in Germany
Swiss expatriate sportspeople in Cyprus
Expatriate footballers in Germany
Expatriate footballers in Cyprus
Olympiakos Nicosia players
Sportspeople from Aargau